Acrocercops rhothogramma is a moth of the family Gracillariidae. It was described by Thomas Bainbrigge Fletcher in 1933 and is known from Bihar, India.

The larvae feed on Breynia rhamnoides and Breynia vitis-idaea. They probably mine the leaves of their host plant.

References

rhothogramma
Moths described in 1933
Moths of Asia